Poecilotheria formosa is a species of tarantula, commonly known as the salem ornamental, beautiful parachute spider, or finely formed parachute spider.

Distribution
P. formosa is found only in South-Eastern Ghats between Salem and Tirupathi in southern India. The population is decreasing due to habitat loss and pet trade.

References

Further reading
 Encyclopedia of Life: P. formosa
 Poecilotheria formosa 
 Itis

External links
Tarantupedia
Images

formosa
Spiders of the Indian subcontinent
Endemic fauna of India
Spiders described in 1899